Christopher Mark Unthank (born 31 August 1972 in Frankston, Victoria) is a retired Australian athlete who specialised in the 3000 metres steeplechase. He represented his country at two Summer Olympics, in 1996 and 2000, reaching the semifinals on the first occasion.

Competition record

Personal bests
One mile – 4:00.50 (Melbourne 1998)
5000 metres – 13:56.24 (Melbourne 1997)
3000 metres steeplechase – 8:24.48 (Hechtel 1997)

References

1972 births
Living people
Australian male steeplechase runners
Athletes (track and field) at the 1996 Summer Olympics
Athletes (track and field) at the 2000 Summer Olympics
Athletes (track and field) at the 1998 Commonwealth Games
Olympic athletes of Australia
Athletes from Melbourne
Commonwealth Games competitors for Australia
People from Frankston, Victoria
Sportsmen from Victoria (Australia)